Mughal clothing refers to clothing developed by the Mughals in the 16th, 17th and 18th centuries throughout the extent of their empire in the Indian subcontinent. It was characterized by luxurious styles and was made with muslin, silk, velvet and brocade. Elaborate patterns including dots, checks, and waves were used with colors from various dyes including cochineal, sulfate of iron, sulfate of copper and sulfate of antimony were used.

Men traditionally wore long over-lapping coat known as Jama with patka sash tied around on the waist and " "Paijama" style pants were worn (leg coverings that gave the English word pajama) under the Jama. A "pagri" (turban) was worn on the head to complete the outfit. Women wore "shalwar", churidar", "dhilja", "gharara", and "farshi". They wore much jewelry including earrings, nose jewelry, necklaces, bangles, belts, and anklets. Other clothing types included: "peshwaz" style robes and "yalek" robes.

Pagri styles included: "Chau-goshia", in four segments, the dome shaped "qubbedar", "kashiti", "dupalli", embroidered "nukka dar", and embroidered and velvet "mandil". Shoe styles included jhuti", "kafsh", "charhvan", "salim shahi" and "khurd nau" and were curved up at the front. Lucknow was known for its shoes and threading embroidery with gold and silver aughi during the era. Mughal emperor turbans usually had turban ornaments on them. They were made of gold and precious gems such as rubies, diamonds, emeralds and sapphire.They wore a ring on every finger

Headwear

During the reign of Akbar, the typical Mughal turban was popularized which was wrapped directly on the head as it lacked a kulah(cap) and involved a tight bundle in the front and an ascending slope backwards so that it bulged near the back. A turban band or sash was wrapped across the turban to keep it in place, which was usually made of a different material than the turban itself.

Women's fashion

Beauty routine 
Women of the imperial court practiced an elaborate beauty ritual consisting of the 16 celebrated rituals. Eyebrows were arched symmetrically, Kajal applied to eyelids, the teeth were whitened with missi. Nath worn on the nose, studded with diamonds, was usually gifted to a bride by her husband. Betel leaf was used to redden the lips, sweeten breath and as deodorant. Princesses always decorated hands and feet red with mehendi, despite the great cost as it was also used as a remedy for skin irritations.

Jewelry  
Jewelry-making practices flourished during the Mughal period, which is well-documented through chronicles and paintings. Mughal paintings from Akbar's reign gave the art renewed vigor, and a range of designs were developed. The Mughals contributed to almost all fields of development of jewelry. The use of jewelry was an integral part of the lifestyle, be it the king, men or women or even the king's horse. Women were known to have as many as 8 complete sets of jewelry. Popular ornaments included two-inch-wide armlets worn above the elbows, bracelets or pearls at the wrist stacked high enough to impede access to the pulse, many rings (with the mirror ring worn on the right thumb customary for nearly all the inhabitants of the Zenana), strings of pearls (as many as 15 strings at a time), metal bands or strings of pearls at the bottom of their legs, and ornaments hanging in the middle of the head in the shape of star, sun, moon, or a flower.

Turban jewelry was considered a privilege of the Emperor. The constant change in the influences from Europe can be clearly witnessed in the design of the turban jewelry. Akbar stuck to Iranian trends of the time by keeping a feather plume upright at the very front of the turban. Jahangir initiated his own softer style with the weighed down plume with a large pearl. By the time of Aurangzeb, this form became more ubiquitous. Turbans were usually heavily set with jewels and fixed firmly with a gem set kalangi or aigrette, similar in style to the Ottoman aigrette worn by the Sultan. Some of the popular head ornaments worn by men were Jigha and Sarpatti,  Sarpech, Kalgi, Mukut, Turra and Kalangi. Women also adorned a variety of head ornaments such as Binduli, Kotbiladar, Sekra, Siphul, Tikka and Jhumar. In addition to these, the braid ornaments constituted an important part of women's head ornaments.

Ear ornaments were also quite popular during the Mughal times. Mughal paintings have represented earrings quite often. Ear ornaments were worn by both men and women. Mor-Bhanwar, Bali, Jhumkas, Kanphool and Pipal patra or papal patti are some of the known earrings from the period. 

Neck ornaments of different kinds of pearls and precious stones were worn by men and women. Some of the neck ornaments for men included Latkan, amala necklace as well as Mala. Neck ornaments formed an important part of jewelry of women also and included Guluband, Hans, Har and Hasuli. 

Nose ornaments were worn solely by women. The variety of nose ornaments worn by women during the Mughal times constituted phul, besar, laung, balu, nath and Phuli.

Dress 
Owing to the relative isolation of the ladies in court, due to the Purdah, fashion in the early days of the empire adhered to traditional dress of Khurasan and Persia. In time, the social and diplomatic relationships between the Mughal Dynasty and the rest of India (Rajputana in particular), led to more exchange in accoutrements. 
Noble women in the court of Babur or Humayun would have begun their outfits with wide loose pants, painted or stripped. Their upper body was covered in loose garments fastened at the neck or with "V"-shaped necklines. Other articles of clothing included the Yalek: a tightly fitting nearly floor length vest, buttoned in the front, with the chest accentuated, in both short and long sleeve varieties.

With the addition of Rajput princesses during the reign of Akbar, Hindu clothing came to influence the court. The wives and consorts began to dress similarly, regardless of religion. Often the ladies wore multiple layers of clothing, with a tight fitting bodice that stopped short of the navel. The peshwaz, fashionable as a men's garment for a time and later adopted by the women, was added on top. The length hit the knees or lower, the waist fastened closely, and the neckline was in a "V" shape. The opening at the front of the peshwaz would have been decorated in gold. Their lower half were covered either in tight pants (tunban or izar), or in la hengu, which itself was styled like a lungi attached at the ends and a band sewn into the top. Muslim women favored the pants style, and Hindu women, the skirt. In either style, the drawstrings were decorated at length with pearls and jewels.

Only the costliest clothes of cotton, silk or wool were used. In the zenana, there were multiple costume changes a day, and often an outfit would be worn only once and then given away. The garments themselves were very thin, weighing less than an ounce each, with gold lace added and “muslin so fine as to be almost transparent.” This may account for the breasts occasionally seen in Mughal miniature painting. The head was covered with gold cloths or turbans with feathers. Long gowns (qaba) or kashmiri shawl were used in cold weather. Jamawars were suits of wool with flowers interwoven with wool or silk. Patterned and bejeweled shoes, with distinctively sharp upward curling points and worn down heels were fashionable.

Textiles 
Fabrics of the time included wild goat's hair cloth (tus) and pashmina, and light and warm wool. Silks were often embroidered with gold and silver thread and embellished with laces. Fabrics such as silk are often thought to be the material of choice for the wealthy, but wool, cotton, and goat-hair fabrics were also highly valuable due to their sensory value (softness, warmth, etc.). In Mughal India, textiles were valued for a variety of reasons, such as for the monetary value of the materials, the sensory qualities, the metaphorical/symbolic attachments, and the socio-political associations.

Any and all of these cloths were regularly scented with rose water. Shawls were reportedly so thin they could pass through a finger ring. The various muslins had poetic names like ab-i-rawan, meaning "running water", and daft hawa, meaning "woven air". Each garment would wear out after a single use.

Silk 
Silk was a highly valuable material at the time of the Mughal dynasty, however silk production was not prevalent in the Mughal territories of India. Besides the cultivation of a thicker, off-colored silk from wild silkworms in Assam, India mainly relied on imports from Iran, China, and Central Asia for silk. Emperor Akbar's invasion of Bengal and Kashmir also gave the Mughals access to the silk production in those regions.

Cotton 
Malmal, or Muslin, is a cotton cloth that was also highly valued all across Europe, Africa, the Middle East, and Asia. Spinners in Bengal would spin the cotton thread in early mornings or on humid afternoons as the fibers are most pliable under warm and humid conditions. Weaving the cotton to make the muslin cloth was an arduous and time-consuming task that could take up to six months for just twenty yards, making malmal equally as or even more expensive than silk. Calico is another similar cotton cloth to muslin. The two cloths could be easily mistaken, but generally calico is slightly thicker and heavier than muslin. Thin cotton cloths such as these would often be worn in hot weather. Clothing items such as jamas and dupattas could be made out of cotton textiles. 

Cotton cloth was also often dyed using plants like Citrifolia root and indigo, which produced red and blue dye respectively. The process of dyeing the cloth involved submerging the cloth in the indigo solution, laying it out to drain in the air, rinsing the cloth, then washing it with diluted sulfuric acid to dissolve the residual calcium carbonate. As well as dyeing, cloth was also painted or stamped, often with floral patterns. Chintz was a type of calico fabric that was painted free hand using a bush and pencil or printed with a stamping block.

The Artisans 
In Mughal India, artisans were in similar economic standing to peasants. Despite artisans' skill in producing beautiful workmanship and increased patronage of the arts within the ruling class during Mughal times, the average artisan was poorly compensated for their work.

See also
 Būrk
 Clothing in India
 Fūta
 Islamic clothing
 Jagulfi
 Economy of the Mughal Empire
 Muslin trade in Bengal

References

Further reading
 Roe, T., & Foster, William. (1899). The embassy of Sir Thomas Roe to the court of the Great Mogul, 1615-1619 : As narrated in his journal and correspondence (Works issued by the Hakluyt Society ; 2nd ser., no. 1). London: Printed for the Hakluyt society
 Bernier, F., Brock, Irving, & Constable, Archibald. (1968). Travels in the Mogul empire, A. D. 1656-1668. (A rev. and improved [2d] ed. based upon Irving Brock's translation, by Archibald Constable.. ed.). Delhi: S. Chand.
 Manucci, N., & Irvine, William. (1981). Storia do Mogor; or, Mogul India, 1653-1708. Cornell: Oriental Books Reprint Corp.